South Terrebonne High School is a public secondary school in Bourg, Louisiana, United States.  It is a part of the Terrebonne Parish School District.

South Terrebonne High currently serves the coastal communities of Bourg, Chauvin, Montegut, Pointe-aux-Chenes, and the eastern part of incorporated Houma in Terrebonne Parish, Louisiana.

History
It was the second high school built in Terrebonne Parish after the parish's sole high school, Terrebonne High School, became overcrowed with an influx of students from the lower areas of the parish.

The school was designed by the architectural firm of Curtis and Davis, who later designed the Louisiana Superdome in New Orleans.

South Terrebonne High was officially opened in 1961, with the first graduating class commencing in 1962.  Most of the first graduating class were transferred into South Terrebonne for their senior year when the district was reapportioned, and some students delayed their graduation from Terrebonne High in 1961 in order to graduate in the first graduating class at the new school in 1962.

In 1968 Southdown High School (originally Houma Colored High School), which educated black students in Terrebonne Parish, closed. Students were moved to South Terrebonne High and Terrebonne High School.

Prior to 1988, South Terrebonne housed students in their sophomore, junior, or senior year.  Once Ellender Memorial High School was expanded from a junior high school to become the parish's fourth high school, freshmen were then added to South Terrebonne.  Today, the school houses over 1,000 students in grades 9-12, with 8th graders added in special education or advanced gifted classes.

From 2015 to 2016 the Louisiana State Department of Education score for this school increased from 88.8 to 108, meaning the ranking improved to an "A" level.

Extracurricular clubs and activities
 4-H
 Art Club - made up of students taking classes in Art
 Band Council - made up of members from the STHS Band
 Carnival Tableau - Mardi Gras carnival court voted and presented by student body, with accompanying talent show
 STHS Cheerleaders
 STHS Choir
 Choir Council - made up of members from the STHS Choir
 COE - for students interested in administrative field
 DECA
 Drama Club
 Gatorettes - high-step dance team
 Key Club - philanthropy
 Library Club
 Million Dollar Band from Gatorland - award-winning marching band, drumline, and color guard
 Multi Media - television/video/radio/music production
 National Honor Society - academic honor society for juniors and seniors
 G3(Gators Gone Godly)-South Terrebonne non denominational Christian Club
 Publications - Gator Tales newspaper and Notre Temps yearbook
 Quiz Bowl - students participate against other schools in rapid-fire quiz format
 Renaissance Club - Honors Student Incentive Program
 STHS Student Council - voted by student body

Athletics
South Terrebonne competes in District 7 of Class AAAA (4A), the second highest classification of athletics in the LHSAA.

The school participates in varsity, junior varsity, and freshman athletics in 13 sports.

 baseball
 basketball (boys & girls)
 cross country (boys & girls)
 football
 golf (boys)
 soccer (boys & girls)
 softball

 swimming (boys & girls)
 tennis (boys & girls)
 track & field (boys & girls)
 volleyball (girls)
 bowling (boys & girls)
 powerlifting (boys & girls)

Championships

Football
 State Championships: 1 (Class AAAA - 1992)
 District Championships: 6

Baseball
 State Championships: 1 (Class AAAA - 2022)

Bowling
Boys
 District Championships: 1 (2011)
 State Championship Runners-up (2011)

Soccer
Boys
 District Championships: 1 (1992)
  State 4AAAA Runners-up (2002)

Softball
 District Championships: 6

Swimming
Individual Boys
 State Championships: 4 (100 yd. Backstroke - 2002, 2003, 2004; 100 yd. Breaststroke - 2004)

Tennis
Boys
 District Championships: 4 (1980, 1982, 1986, 1995)
 Notable Past Players: Ron Cox Jr, Landon LeBouef, Joeby Luke

Girls
 District Championships: 4 (1982, 1984, 1989, 1994)
 Regional Championships: 3 (1982, 1983, 1984)

Track & Field
Boys Team
 State Championships: 1 (Class AAAA - 1973)
 Regional Championships: 4 (Class AAAA - 1976, 1979, 2002, 2003)
 District Championships: 9 (1965, 1966, 1967, 1973, 1975, 1979, 1981, 2002, 2003, 2012)
 Terrebonne Parish Championships: 7 (1966, 1975, 1976, 1979, 1983, 2002, 2003, 2008, 2009, 2011)

Girls Team
 District Championships: 7 (2014,2013,1979, 1985, 1994, 1995, 1996)
 Terrebonne Parish Championships: 6 (1981, 1982, 1985, 1993, 1995, 1996)

School rivalries
 Terrebonne High School - Since 1961, when athletics began at South Terrebonne, it has continued to be the oldest living intra-parish rivalry.  The schools are both known for their intense "dislike" for one another, on and off the fields of play.
 Ellender Memorial High School - This became most recent rivalry, especially in football, when Ellender became a high school in 1988.  Both schools share a common football field located at South Terrebonne's campus.  South Terrebonne has dominated Ellender since 1996, and has only lost one game to Ellender since then.  Also, each school's student body competes in the "Battle for the Spirit Stick", where students purchase construction paper chain links in each schools colors to adorn the stadium on game night.  The school who sells the most links maintains the Spirit Stick until the following year. This is where the South Terrebonne's tradition of "Camo-Day" originated. Each South Terrebonne/Ellender football game the students at South Terrebonne High School dress in their camouflage clothing, paint their faces, and decorate the school with a swamp theme. Both schools have pep rallies for this occasion that show the "special" rivalry between the two schools.
 South Lafourche High School - This is the lesser-advertised rivalry in the area.  Both are the southernmost high schools in their respective parishes.  Each school has a history of surprising wins and devastating losses to the other in many sports.  The rivalry is further fueled by each school's fan base, where old-fashioned "in your face" mockery is steeped in the area's Cajun culture.

School songs
The South Terrebonne High Fight Song was written from the combination of fight songs from two universities.  The first verse was taken from the Victory March of the University of Notre Dame, while the second verse was taken from The Victors of the University of Michigan.

Notable alumni
 Norby Chabert (Class of 1994), state senator from Terrebonne and Lafourche parishes since 2009
 Troy Johnson (Class of 1979), NFL wide receiver
 Phillip Livas (Class of 2007), NFL wide receiver from 2011-2012
 Clarence Verdin (Class of 1979), NFL wide receiver

References

External links
 South Terrebonne High Website

Public high schools in Louisiana
Schools in Terrebonne Parish, Louisiana